Kerenka was an informal name of banknotes issued by the Russian Provisional Government in 1917, named so after the chairman Alexander Kerensky. They were also issued by the Gosbank of the Soviet Russia during 1917-1919 from the same plates until the introduction of sovznaks.

Economy of Russia
Economy of the Soviet Union
Modern obsolete currencies
Russian Provisional Government
1917 in Russia